How to Avoid a Climate Disaster: The Solutions We Have and the Breakthroughs We Need is a 2021 book by Bill Gates. In it, Gates presents what he learned in over a decade of studying climate change and investing in innovations to address global warming and recommends strategies to tackle it.

Content 

When it comes to climate change, I know innovation isn’t the only thing we need. But we cannot keep the earth livable without it. Techno-fixes are not sufficient, but they are necessary.

- Bill Gates, from page 14 of his book, How to Avoid a Climate Disaster (2021).

The book's five parts 

The book is organized into five parts. In part one (chapter 1), Gates explains why the world must completely eliminate greenhouse gas emissions ("getting to zero"), rather than simply reducing them. In part two (chapter 2) he discusses the challenges that will make achieving this goal very difficult. In part three (chapter 3) he outlines five pragmatic questions a reader can ask to evaluate any conversation they have about climate change. Part four (the longest part of the book, or chapters 4 through 9) analyzes currently-available technologies that can be utilized now to adapt to and mitigate climate change ("the solutions we have") and those areas where innovation is needed to make climate-friendly technologies cost competitive with their fossil fuel counterparts ("the breakthroughs we need"). In the final part (chapters 10 through 12) Gates suggests specific steps that can be taken by government leaders, market participants and individuals to collectively avoid a climate disaster.

Electricity generation 

Gates thinks that decarbonizing electricity should be a priority, because it would not only reduce emissions from coal and gas used to produce electricity, but also allow an accelerated shift to zero emission transportation like electric cars. He advocates increased innovation and investment in nuclear energy, and warns against overly focusing on wind and solar generation, due to their intermittent nature.

Roles for government and business 

Gates argues that both governments and businesses have parts to play in fighting global warming. While he acknowledges that there is a tension between economic development and sustainability, he posits that accelerated innovation in green technology, particularly sustainable energy, would resolve it. He calls on governments to increase investment in climate research, but at the same time to incentivize firms to invest in green energy and decarbonization. Gates also urges governments to institute a carbon pricing regime that would account for all externalities involved in producing and using carbon-emitting energy.

Get to zero rather than simply reducing emissions 
The book describes strategies for achieving net zero greenhouse gas emissions by 2050, and emphasizes that many efforts to reduce emissions are actually counter-productive. For example, one can reduce CO2 emissions in 2030 by replacing a coal-fired electrical power plant with a new natural gas power plant (since coal combustion emits twice as much CO2 as natural gas, per unit of electricity). However, the natural gas plant will still be emitting CO2 in 2050. Alternatively, Gates prefers we spend money on infrastructure that does not emit CO2 in 2050. Gates warns, "Making reductions by 2030 the wrong way might actually prevent us from ever getting to zero."

Gates' plan to get to net zero emissions 
Gates introduces a plan for getting to net zero greenhouse gas emissions in Chapters 11 and 12 with several key points:

 The world needs to get to zero emissions, not just reduce.
 The world needs to accelerate the development of technology that helps to resolve the climate change problem. 
 The world needs to reduce the additional cost of green energy, which he refers to as the "green premium".
 Federal, state and local governments can play a role to reduce emissions; in addition to private citizens.

Publication 
How to Avoid a Climate Disaster was published in hardcover by Alfred A. Knopf on February 16, 2021. An audiobook narrated by Gates and Wil Wheaton was released the same day. A large-print paperback edition was published on February 23, 2021.

The book debuted at number one on The New York Times nonfiction best-seller list for the week ending February 20, 2021.

Reception 
The ideas in How to Avoid a Climate Disaster generated discussions and commentary on both sides of the Atlantic.

Politicians, journalists and activists

Gordon Brown 

Writing in The Guardian, former UK prime minister Gordon Brown made generally positive comments on the book, but warned that it only touches briefly on the political obstacles the international community must navigate before a cataclysm is averted:

Bill McKibben 

Like Brown, US climate activist Bill McKibben faulted How to Avoid a Climate Disaster for not spending more time discussing the political impediments preventing action on climate change mitigation. However, McKibben's criticisms were more pointed:

The Economist 

British newspaper The Economist praised Gates for the book's "cold-eyed realism and number-crunched optimism." While acknowledging that some might consider both the book's promotion of nuclear power and its emphasis on the constraints imposed by intermittency in wind and solar power generation to be an "outmoded mindset," eventually The Economist review concluded that Gates has the right big idea by stressing the need for innovation:

Canadian-American political scientist Leah Stokes described the book as largely "technology solutionism" when compared to other books published at a similar time such as Under a White Sky by Elizabeth Kolbert.

Traditional book reviewers 
In its starred review, Kirkus Reviews called it a "supremely authoritative and accessible plan for how we can avoid a climate catastrophe." Publishers Weekly agreed, calling it a "cogent" and "accessible" guide to countering climate change. However, the publication wrote that "not all of his ideas strike as politically feasible."

References 

2021 non-fiction books
Works by Bill Gates
Climate change books
Alfred A. Knopf books